Denos Adjima Beche (born 30 November 1943) is an Ivorian middle-distance runner. He competed in the men's 1500 metres at the 1964 Summer Olympics.

References

External links
 

1943 births
Living people
Athletes (track and field) at the 1964 Summer Olympics
Ivorian male middle-distance runners
Olympic athletes of Ivory Coast
Place of birth missing (living people)